Torres Vedras (São Pedro e Santiago e Santa Maria do Castelo e São Miguel) e Matacães is a civil parish in the municipality of Torres Vedras, Portugal. It was formed in 2013 by the merger of the former parishes Torres Vedras (São Pedro e Santiago), Torres Vedras (Santa Maria do Castelo e São Miguel) and Matacães. The population in 2011 was 25,717, in an area of 62.44 km2.

References

Freguesias of Torres Vedras